Michael Basnight (born September 3, 1977) is a former American football running back who played one season with the Cincinnati Bengals of the National Football League. He played college football at North Carolina Agricultural and Technical State University and attended Booker T. Washington High School in Norfolk, Virginia.

College career
Basnight played for the North Carolina A&T Aggies, rushing for a career total of 2,544 yards. He won the Jake Gaither Award, given to the nation's best player from a historically black college, his senior season in 1998. He graduated with a Bachelor of Science in Art Design.

Professional career

Cincinnati Bengals
Basnight signed with the Cincinnati Bengals after going undrafted in the 1999 NFL Draft. He played in thirteen games, starting one, for the Bengals during the 1999 season. He was released by the Bengals on August 27, 2001.

Houston Texans
Basnight signed with the Houston Texans on December 29, 2001. He was released by the Texans on April 23, 2002.

References

External links
Just Sports Stats

1977 births
Living people
Players of American football from Norfolk, Virginia
American football running backs
African-American players of American football
North Carolina A&T Aggies football players
Cincinnati Bengals players
21st-century African-American sportspeople
20th-century African-American sportspeople